Collected, released on 5 October 2010, is a compilation album from the British musician Joe Jackson, best known for his hits in the late '70s and well into the '80s. The album features hits and album tracks from all stages of his career plus a handful of live recordings on Disc Three. It includes the hits "Is She Really Going Out with Him?", "Steppin' Out", "Breaking Us in Two", "Nineteen Forever" and more.

Track listing

References

2010 compilation albums
Joe Jackson (musician) albums